KLHT (1040 kHz) is a non-commercial AM radio station in Honolulu, Hawaii, with a Christian talk and teaching format.  The station is owned by Calvary Chapel of Honolulu, Inc., with studios and offices on Kono Mai Drive in Aiea.  Its on-air branding is "K-Light 1040 AM" and its slogan is "The Pure Light of Hawaii."  

KLHT is powered at 10,000 watts, using a non-directional antenna, as a Class B station.  The transmitter is off Nimetz Freeway, near the Ke'ehi Lagoon.

History
It was owned by Kaiser Hawaiian Village Radio, Inc.  The call sign was KHVH, which stood form Hawaiian Village, Honolulu. The studios were at 1290 Ala Moana Boulevard.

For a time in the 1970s, it ran an all-news radio format using the service of NBC Radio's News and Information Service and CBS Radio News.

Programming
KLHT programming consists of Christian talk and teaching shows with some contemporary worship music.  Many Calvary Chapel pastors are featured, including The Word for Today with Chuck Smith, A New Beginning with Greg Laurie, Somebody Loves You with Raul Ries and As We Gather with Bill Stonebraker, senior pastor of Calvary Chapel Honolulu.  The station also airs live broadcasts of Calvary Chapel Honolulu's Sunday morning and evening services.

National religious shows include Focus on the Family with Jim Daly, Truth for Life with Alistair Begg, Insight for Living with Chuck Swindoll, Love Worth Finding with Adrian Rogers, Turning Point with David Jeremiah, Let My People Think with Ravi Zacharias and Thru the Bible with the late J. Vernon McGee.

References

External links
FCC History Cards for KLHT

 KLHT official website
 Calvary Chapel Honolulu

Christianity in Honolulu
LHT
LHT
Radio stations established in 1957
1957 establishments in Hawaii